Bortolami is a contemporary art gallery founded in 2005 by Stefania Bortolami and Amalia Dayan. Before opening the gallery, Bortolami worked for Anthony d'Offay. Dayan was a director with Gagosian Gallery. The gallery has an exhibition space in Tribeca, but also organizes 12-month long contemporary art exhibitions in unlikely locations for its Artist/City project that pairs an artist with an American city. Artists who have participated in the project include Daniel Buren, Eric Wesley  and Tom Burr

Artists 

The gallery represents:

 Richard Aldrich
 Robert Bordo
 Daniel Buren
 Tom Burr
 Morgan Fisher (artist)
 Michel François (artist)
 Piero Golia
 Nicolás Guagnini
 Lena Henke
 Ann Veronica Janssens
 Barbara Kasten
 Caitlin Keogh
 Scott King (artist)
 Ivan Morley
 Rebecca Morris
 Mary Obering
 Luigi Ontani
 Anna Ostoya
 Virginia Overton
 Claudio Parmiggiani
 Marina Rheingantz
Aki Sasamoto
 Ben Schumacher
 Lesley Vance
 Eric Wesley

References

External links 
 

Contemporary art galleries in the United States
2005 establishments in New York City
Art galleries established in 2005
Tribeca